Antonio Baños Boncompain (born 1967 in Barcelona, Catalonia) is a Spanish Catalan musician, journalist and writer. In the Catalan parliamentary election of 2015 he led Popular Unity Candidacy - Constituent Call, a pro-independence left-wing electoral list until he resigned in 2016.

Baños has a degree in journalism from the Autonomous University of Barcelona. As a musician he's been a member of the band Los Carradine since 1989 and has released two records: Sospechoso tren de vida (2006) and Academia rocanrol (2016).

He is national secretary of the ANC and speaker of Súmate.

Publications
Baños has written books and several articles, including:

References

External links

1967 births
Autonomous University of Barcelona alumni
Journalists from Catalonia
Living people
Members of the 11th Parliament of Catalonia
People from Barcelona
Popular Unity Candidacy politicians